WMBL can refer to:

 Western Canadian Baseball League, formerly known as Western Major Baseball League
 WMBL (FM), an FM radio station licensed to Mitchell, Indiana
 WMBL (AM), a former radio station in Morehead City, North Carolina